Luang Yuthasastr Kosol (personal name Prayoon Yuthasastrkosol, 19 October 1893 – 11 December 1975) was a Commander of the Royal Thai Navy.

Early career
Prayoon joined the Royal Thai Naval Academy on 18 April 1919, and continued his studies at Thai Naval War College in 1932, where his fraternity brothers dubbed him "The professor", a nickname he kept throughout his navy career. Prayoon served in the Royal Thai Navy from 1932 to his retirement in 1957 in many positions: 
 Commander in Chief of the Royal Thai Navy
 Admiral of the Fleet in the Royal Thai Navy 
 General in the Royal Thai Army Air Force  
 Air Chief Marshal in the Royal Thai Air Force
 Deputy Prime Minister 
 Minister of Agriculture 
 Minister of Cooperatives 
 Minister of Culture 
 Secretary of the Ministry of Defense 
Among several official visits, Luang Yuthasastr Kosol represented Thailand in Spain, Italy, Japan, Switzerland, France, Belgium, Norway, Sweden, Denmark, USA, Taiwan and Hong Kong.  In 1953, Luang Yuthasastr Kosol led the Naval Parade for the Queen’s Coronation held in the United Kingdom.

Later career
During his last years of service, Prayoon undertook several agricultural projects such as the creation of a secured and self-managed market by parboiled rice farmers, including increased marketing opportunities and refrigeration as well as rural reconstruction of liquid gas propane, and rubber industry. An oil refinery in cooperation with American Petroleum Export Company through the flotation of a bond issue to fund the project and the initiation of the deep-sea port in Si Racha District.

Awards and decorations
  Knight Grand Cordon of the Most Exalted Order of the White Elephant
  Knight Grand Cordon of the Most Noble Order of the Crown
  Knight Grand Commander of the Most Illustrious Order of Chula Chom Klao
  Victory Medal - Indochina
  Safeguarding the Constitution Medal
  Border Service Medal
  Chakra Mala Medal
  King Rama VI Royal Cypher Medal
  King Rama VII Royal Cypher Medal
  King Rama VIII Royal Cypher Medal
  King Rama IX Royal Cypher Medal
 United Nations Medal (Korean War)
 Red Cross Medal (Germany)
 Italian Crown (Italy)
 Japanese Medal
 Legion d’Honneur (France)
 First class medals (Laos, Cambodia, Burma)

References

Prayoon Yuthasastrkosol
1893 births
1975 deaths
Prayoon Yuthasastrkosol
Prayoon Yuthasastrkosol

Prayoon Yuthasastrkosol
Prayoon Yuthasastrkosol
Prayoon Yuthasastrkosol